Stanley Allison Rogers (November 29, 1949 – June 2, 1983) was a Canadian folk musician and songwriter.

Rogers was noted for his rich, baritone voice and his traditional-sounding songs which were frequently inspired by Canadian history and the daily lives of working people, especially those from the fishing villages of the Maritime provinces and, later, the farms of the Canadian prairies and Great Lakes. Rogers died in a fire aboard Air Canada Flight 797 on the ground at the Greater Cincinnati Airport at the age of 33.

Early life and musical development
Rogers was born in Hamilton, Ontario, the eldest son of Nathan Allison Rogers and Valerie (née Bushell) Rogers, two Maritimers who had relocated to Ontario in search of work shortly after their marriage in July 1948. Although Rogers was raised in Binbrook, Ontario, he often spent summers visiting family in Guysborough County, Nova Scotia.

It was there that he became familiar with the way of life in the Maritimes, an influence which was to have a profound impact on his subsequent musical development. He was interested in music from an early age, reportedly beginning to sing shortly after learning to speak. He received his first guitar, a miniature hand-built by his uncle Lee Bushell, when he was five years of age. He was exposed to a variety of music influences, but among the most lasting were the country and western tunes his uncles would sing during family get-togethers. Throughout his childhood, he would practice his singing and playing along with his brother Garnet, six years his junior.

While Rogers was attending Saltfleet High School, Stoney Creek, Ontario, he started to meet other young people interested in folk music, although at this time he was dabbling in rock and roll, singing and playing bass guitar in garage bands such as "Stanley and the Living Stones" and "The Hobbits". After high school, Rogers briefly attended both McMaster University and Trent University, where he performed in small venues with other student musicians, including Ian Tamblyn, Chris Ward and fellow Hobbit Nigel Russell. Russell wrote the song "White Collar Holler", which Rogers sang frequently on stage.

Rogers signed with RCA Records in 1970 and recorded two singles: "Here's to You Santa Claus" in 1970, and "The Fat Girl Rag" in 1971. In 1973, Rogers recorded three singles for Polygram: "Three Pennies", "Guysborough Train", and "Past Fifty."

In 1976, Rogers recorded his debut album, Fogarty's Cove, released in 1977 on Barnswallow Records. The album's subject matter dealt almost entirely with life in maritime Canada, and was an immediate success. Rogers then formed Fogarty's Cove Music, and bought Barnswallow during the production of Turnaround, allowing him to release his own albums. Posthumously, additional albums were released.
 

Rogers' songs often had a Celtic feel which was due, in part, to his frequent use of DADGAD guitar tuning. He regularly used his William 'Grit' Laskin built 12-string guitar in his performances. His best-known pieces include "Northwest Passage", "Barrett's Privateers", "The Mary Ellen Carter", "Make and Break Harbour", "The Idiot", "Fogarty's Cove", and "White Squall".

Death
Rogers died alongside 22 other passengers most likely of smoke inhalation on June 2, 1983, while travelling on Air Canada Flight 797 (a McDonnell Douglas DC-9) after performing at the Kerrville Folk Festival. The airliner was flying from Dallas, Texas, to Toronto and Montreal when a fire from an unknown ignition source within the vanity or toilet shroud of the aft washroom forced it to make an emergency landing at the Greater Cincinnati Airport in northern Kentucky. There were initially no visible flames, and after attempts to extinguish the fire were unsuccessful, smoke filled the cabin. Upon landing, the plane's doors were opened, allowing the five crew and 18 of the 41 passengers to escape, but approximately 90 seconds into the evacuation the oxygen rushing in from outside caused a flash fire.

Legacy
Rogers' remains were cremated, and his ashes were scattered off the coast of Nova Scotia.

Rogers' legacy includes his recordings, songbook, and plays for which he was commissioned to write music. His songs are still frequently covered by other musicians, and are perennial favourites at Canadian campfires and song circles. Members of Rogers' band, including his brother Garnet Rogers, continue to be active performers and form a significant part of the fabric of contemporary Canadian folk music. Following his death, he was nominated for the 1984 Juno Awards in the category for Best Male Vocalist. That same year, he was posthumously awarded the Diplôme d’Honneur of the Canadian Conference of the Arts. In 1994, his posthumous live album Home in Halifax was likewise nominated for Best Roots and Traditional Album.

His widow, Ariel, continues to oversee his estate and legacy. His music and lyrics have been featured in numerous written publications and films. For instance, his lyrics have appeared in school poetry books, taking their place alongside acknowledged classics. His song "Northwest Passage" was featured in the last episode of the TV show Due South, his songs "Barrett's Privateers" and "Watching the Apples Grow" having been previously featured. "Barrett's Privateers" has also been used extensively in promotion ads for Alexander Keith's ale. In the 2005 CTV made-for-TV movie on the life of Terry Fox, Rogers' "Turnaround" is the music over the closing shot. As the movie ends, Fox is depicted, alone, striding up a hill, while the lyric "And yours was the open road. The bitter song / The heavy load that I'll never share, tho' the offer's still there / Every time you turn around," forges a link between these Canadian icons. Many of his songs on the albums Northwest Passage and From Fresh Water refer to events in Canadian history.

Adrienne Clarkson, who, prior to serving as the Governor General of Canada from 1999 to 2005, had worked for the Canadian Broadcasting Corporation, highlighted Rogers' career in a 1989 television documentary called One Warm Line on CBC Television; she also quoted Rogers in her investitural address.

When CBC's Peter Gzowski asked Canadians to pick an alternate national anthem, "Northwest Passage" was the overwhelming choice.

The Stan Rogers Folk Festival is held every year in Canso, Nova Scotia. In 1995, several artists performed two nights of concerts at Halifax's Rebecca Cohn Auditorium, which were released on album that year as Remembering Stan Rogers.

Rogers is also a lasting fixture of the Canadian folk festival Summerfolk, held annually in Owen Sound, Ontario, where the main stage and amphitheater are dedicated as the "Stan Rogers Memorial Canopy". The festival is firmly fixed in tradition, with Rogers' song "The Mary Ellen Carter" being sung by all involved, including the audience and a medley of acts at the festival.

At The Canmore Folk Festival, Alberta's longest running folk music festival, performers take to the Stan Rogers Memorial Stage, which is the festival's main stage.

Stan's son, Nathan Rogers, is also an established Canadian folk artist with a voice and lyrical acumen similar to his father's.  He has released two critically acclaimed solo discs and tours internationally as a solo act and in the trio, Dry Bones.

In 2007, Rogers was recognized posthumously with a National Achievement Award at the annual SOCAN Awards held in Toronto.

Canadian Celtic rock band Enter the Haggis regularly performs a cover of “White Squall” to end their shows, and included it on their 2011 album Whitelake.

In 2011, the pirate metal band Alestorm released a cover of Rogers' song "Barrett's Privateers" (Label Napalm Records).

In 2013, Groundwood Books turned Rogers' song "Northwest Passage" into a children's book illustrated by award-winning artist Matt James.

In 2017, Canadian Celtic punk band, The Real McKenzies, released a cover of Rogers' "Northwest Passage" on their album Two Devils Will Talk.

In 2019, Canadian metal band Unleash the Archers released a cover of Rogers' "Northwest Passage" on Napalm Records.

In 2019, Canadian folk punk band The Dreadnoughts released a cover of Rogers' "Northwest Passage", as well as a commemorative song named "Dear Old Stan", on Stomp Records.

In 2020, The Longest Johns released a cover of Rogers' "The Mary Ellen Carter" on their album Smoke and Oakum.

In 2020, Canadian Premier League soccer club HFX Wanderers FC's home kit featured a soundwave image taken from Rogers' "Barrett's Privateers", inspired in part by the song's adoption by Privateers 1882, a supporters group of the Wanderers.

Discography

Singles
"Hail To You Santa Claus" b/w "Coventry Carol" (1970; RCA)
"Fat Girl Rag" b/w "Seven Years Along" (1971, RCA)
"Three Pennies"/"Past Fifty" b/w "Guysborough Train" (1974, CBC Promo)

Albums
Fogarty's Cove (1977)
Turnaround (1978)
Between the Breaks ... Live! (1979)
Northwest Passage (1981)
For the Family (1983)
From Fresh Water (1984)
In Concert (1991)
Home in Halifax (1993)
Poetic Justice (1996) - A collection of two radio plays (Harris and the Mare, based on Stan Rogers' song of the same name, adapted by John Gavin Douglas for the CBC Radio series Nightfall, and The Sisters by Silver Donald Cameron, a play written for CBC Playhouse, for which Rogers wrote and performed the music.)
From Coffee House to Concert Hall (1999)
The Very Best of Stan Rogers (2011)
The Collection 6 CD + 1 DVD Anthology (2013)

See also

Canadian rock
Music of Canada

References

 Obituary, "Stan Rogers, Folk Musician; In Fire Aboard DC9; At 33". Boston Globe, June 5, 1983, page 1.

External links

Official website
The Stan Rogers Folk Festival
Northern Journey entry for Stan Rogers by Gene Wilburn
Stan Rogers at The Canadian Encyclopedia
A Biography of Stan Rogers at Geist.com

1949 births
1983 deaths
Canadian folk singer-songwriters
Canadian baritones
Canadian people of English descent
Musicians from Nova Scotia
Musicians from Hamilton, Ontario
People from Guysborough County, Nova Scotia
Trent University alumni
Deaths by smoke inhalation
Maritime music
People from Dundas, Ontario
20th-century Canadian male singers
Victims of aviation accidents or incidents in 1983
Victims of aviation accidents or incidents in the United States
Accidental deaths in Kentucky
Musicians killed in aviation accidents or incidents
Canadian male singer-songwriters
Canadian male guitarists
Canadian folk guitarists